The General Died at Dawn is a 1936 American drama film that tells the story of a mercenary who meets a beautiful girl while trying to keep arms from getting to a vicious warlord in war-torn China.  The movie was written by Charles G. Booth and Clifford Odets, and directed by Lewis Milestone.

It stars Gary Cooper, Madeleine Carroll, Akim Tamiroff, and Dudley Digges.  Director Milestone has a cameo role.

The movie was nominated for Academy Awards for Best Actor in a Supporting Role (Akim Tamiroff), Best Cinematography, and Best Music, Score. There are several scenes in the film that show startling originality at the time. At one point, the camera focuses on a white door knob, and then dissolves to a white billiard ball to connect disparate scenes. In another scene, two characters have a conversation in which they speculate about the fates of other characters in the drama. The answers to their questions appear in screen segments in the corners of the screen, marking an unusual use of split screen to join narrative.

The main character, O'Hara, is based on the real-life Anglo-Canadian Jewish adventurer Morris Abraham "Two-Gun" Cohen. During the early 1930s, Cohen ran guns for various warlords in mainland China.

This is reported to be the first film to use foam latex prosthetics.  Makeup artist Charles Gemora applied sponge rubber eyelids for one of the actors.

John Howard Reid called it one of the fifty finest films Hollywood ever made.

Cast
 Gary Cooper as O'Hara 
 Madeleine Carroll as Judy Perrie
 Akim Tamiroff as General Yang
 Dudley Digges as Mr. Wu
 Porter Hall as Peter Perrie/Peter Martin
 William Frawley as Brighton
 J.M. Kerrigan as Leach
 Philip Ahn as Oxford
 Lee Tung Foo as Mr. Chen
 Leonid Kinskey as Stewart (shipping line clerk)
 Val Durand as Wong
 Willie Fung as Bartender
 Hans Fuerberg as Yang's Military Advisor
  John O'Hara as Newspaper Reporter

Reception
Writing for The Spectator in 1936, Graham Greene gave the film a mildly good review, calling it "as good as anything to be seen on the screen in London". Greene noted that it was "a melodrama of more than usual skill", but criticized the end of the film and suggested that but-for the "rather ludicrous ending, this would have been one of the best 'thrillers' for some years".

In popular culture
In 1938 an animated cartoon, called The Major Lied Till Dawn, was produced by Leon Schlesinger Productions. In it, a major tells tall tales about his hunting adventures to a boy who resembles Freddie Bartholomew. The character of the major may have been influenced by Colonel Heeza Liar.

A third-season episode of the TV show M*A*S*H was entitled "The General Flipped at Dawn" (broadcast September 10, 1974). In the episode, Harry Morgan appears as Major General Bartford Hamilton Steele, a batty general who is convinced that the 4077th needs to move closer to the front lines, to be near the action. (Morgan formally joined the cast of M*A*S*H in Season Four as the much-saner Colonel Sherman T. Potter.)

The General Danced at Dawn is a collection of short stories by George MacDonald Fraser first published in 1970.

References

External links
 
 
 The General Died at Dawn on Escape: April 16, 1949  
 

1936 films
1930s adventure drama films
American adventure drama films
American black-and-white films
Films directed by Lewis Milestone
Films set in China
Paramount Pictures films
American war films
Films about mercenaries
1936 war films
1936 drama films
Films scored by Werner Janssen
1930s English-language films
1930s American films